Baranovo is a rural locality (a village) in Krasnooktyabrskoye Rural Settlement, Gus-Khrustalny District, Vladimir Oblast, Russia. The population was 57 as of 2010.

Geography 
Baranovo is located on the Sentur River, 41 km south of Gus-Khrustalny (the district's administrative centre) by road. Tsikul is the nearest rural locality.

References 

Rural localities in Gus-Khrustalny District
Melenkovsky Uyezd